Narvik is a Norwegian historical film depicting the Battles of Narvik from 9 April to 8 June 1940. Directed by Erik Skjoldbjærg and made by Nordisk Film, it stars Kristine Hartgen, Carl Martin Eggsbø, Cristoph Gelfert Mathiesen and Henrik Mestad. The film premiered in Norway in December 2022 and was released worldwide (except in Norway) on Netflix in January 2023.

Synopsis 
By April 1940, Narvik, a small town in northern Norway, routinely has 85% of the iron ore used by the Nazi Germany's war machine transported from its port. Attempts to disrupt this process over two months of fierce winter warfare cause Hitler to be handed his first major defeat.

Plot
On April 8, 1940, a group of Norwegian soldiers arrive at Narvik by ship. One of them, Corporal Gunnar Tofte is given permission to go home to see his son Ole on his birthday. He meets his wife Ingrid, who is a waitress at the town's hotel, during a meeting between German and British representatives to discuss working relations between the warring states, who both use the port to import iron ore through the town's railroad to Sweden. 

After spending the night with his family, Gunnar awakes before dawn as Germans soldiers land in Narvik. After a brief standoff, the Norwegian commander orders his troops to withdraw. They march out  to a railroad bridge in the mountains, which their new commander intends to dynamite to prevent its use by the Germans. After phoning his father Aslak on the dynamite's whereabouts, Gunnar is told that his wife and child are on a train heading towards the bridge. Shortly afterwards, a group of civilians, including Ingrid and Ole, appear and cross just as German soldiers arrive. A firefight ensues and the bridge is blown up. Gunnar is captured, while Ingrid and Ole, who decided to watch, are taken back to town. 

The Germans take over the hotel, enlist Ingrid as a translator since she speaks German and search for the British consul, Ross, whom Ingrid hides in a mountain cabin. The German consul Fritz Wussow asks Ingrid to assist him in negotiations with the hostile mayor Theodor Broch. Ingrid in turn asks Wussow to help get Gunnar released. After Ross calls on Ingrid to visit, he convinces her to steal military plans from Wussow by indirectly threatening her. While Ingrid is at the hotel, the British navy enters the harbor and starts firing on the German destroyers there, sending Ingrid, Ole, Aslak and other civilians to hide in a basement. After the engagement, all German destroyers are sunk, but no British soldiers have landed. In the chaos, Ingrid manages to steal a map of German artillery emplacements in town and then gives it to Ross, who sends the information to the British warships. As she returns, the British start bombarding the town, killing Aslak and injuring Ole when a shell lands on their house.

Four weeks later, the Germans have fortified the area around Narvik. In the mountains, Gunnar and other POWs are forced to move supplies for the Germans when they are attacked by French and Norwegian soldiers. Gunnar is rescued and returns to combat, intent on returning to Narvik after being told of his father's death. While hiding in a bunker, Ole suffers an infection from his prior injury as Ingrid braves shellfire to bring him to the hotel and betrays Ross' whereabouts to Wussow in exchange for Ole receiving medical treatment, after which the German doctor removes a piece of shrapnel near his lung. 

Two weeks later, Allied forces enter Narvik. Gunnar and others overcome the German defenses and destroy a large artillery piece firing at the British warships. As the Germans prepare to withdraw, Wussow asks Ingrid to accompany him to Berlin but she declines. He then incorrectly tells her that Gunnar was killed. After taking advice from her boss Polly, who warns her that her collaboration with the Germans is known in the town, Ingrid decides to leave Narvik with Ole.

Gunnar and other soldiers return to Narvik to cheering crowds but is told that his wife was a collaborator. Upon returning to his damaged house, he is reunited with Ingrid and Ole. Ingrid explains her actions to Gunnar, who angrily calls her a traitor as Germans planes bomb Narvik. Gunnar rushes out into the street to see a comrade getting killed. While hearing their commander call for resistance, Gunnar watches Ingrid and Ole leave. They board a fishing boat with other civilians who scorn them for her collaboration before they are joined by Gunnar and escape Narvik before the Germans recapture the city.

Cast
Kristine Hartgen as Ingrid Tofte
Carl Martin Eggsbø as Corporal Gunnar Tofte
Cristoph Gelfert  Mathiesen as Ole Tofte
Henrik Mestad as Major Sigurd Omdal
Mathilde Holtedahl Cuhra as Bjorg
Stig Henrik Hoff as Aslak Tofte
Emil Johnsen as Theodor Broch
Kari Bremnes as Petra 'Polly' Gleditsch 
Cristoph Bach as Consul Fritz Wussow
Billy Campbell as George Gibbs
Holger Handtke as General Eduard Dietl
Magnus Dugdale as Giles Romilly
Edvard Lie Aalstad as Private Magne Hansen
Torfinn Nag as Colonel Konrad Sundlo

Production
Aage Aaberge of Nordisk Films signed a deal to make a film depicting the events at Narvik, in 2016.

Release
The film had a delayed release due to the COVID-19 pandemic. It had its Norwegian premiere on 25 December 2022, prior to its worldwide Netflix release. It passed 400,000 cinema visits to become the most watched Norwegian cinema film from 2022. The film was released in 86 territories by Netflix in January 2023.

Reception
On the review aggregator website Rotten Tomatoes, Narvik holds an approval rating of 100% based on 5 reviews. The film received some criticism for its thin characterisation. Praise came for the cinematography and acting, whilst drawing parallels with events in Ukraine from 2022 onwards.

References

External links
 
 
 

2022 war drama films
2020s Norwegian-language films
Norwegian historical drama films
Norwegian war drama films
War films based on actual events
Films directed by Erik Skjoldbjærg 
Films impacted by the COVID-19 pandemic